Stigmella ilicifoliella is a moth of the family Nepticulidae. It is widespread in Portugal and Spain. In France, it is known from old specimens along the Atlantic coast near Bordeaux and in the Hérault and the Côte d’Azur near Cannes.

The wingspan is 6-6.6 mm. Adults are on wing from June to early September.

The larvae feed on Quercus ilex, Quercus ilex rotundifolia and Quercus suber. They mine the leaves of their host plant. The mine consists of an irregular, broad corridor with a broad frass line that almost fills the gallery, leaving only a narrow transparent zone at either side. Pupation takes place outside of the mine.

External links
Fauna Europaea
bladmineerders.nl
The Quercus Feeding Stigmella Species Of The West Palaearctic: New Species, Key And Distribution (Lepidoptera: Nepticulidae)

Nepticulidae
Moths of Europe
Moths described in 1918